Kenan Şahin (born 27 October 1984) is a Turkish-German footballer who plays as a striker for an amateur German side RSV Urbach.

References

 Elazığspor'da 9 Futbolcu ile Yollar Ayrıldı, haberler.com, 6 January 2016

External links
 
 
 

1984 births
Footballers from Cologne
German people of Turkish descent
Living people
Turkish footballers
Turkey under-21 international footballers
Association football forwards
Bayer 04 Leverkusen players
Bayer 04 Leverkusen II players
FC Energie Cottbus players
TuS Koblenz players
Fortuna Düsseldorf players
1. FC Union Berlin players
Denizlispor footballers
Kayseri Erciyesspor footballers
Mersin İdman Yurdu footballers
Ankaraspor footballers
Boluspor footballers
Elazığspor footballers
İnegölspor footballers
Eyüpspor footballers
Bundesliga players
2. Bundesliga players
3. Liga players
Regionalliga players
Oberliga (football) players
TFF First League players
TFF Second League players
TFF Third League players